Flora Sylvester Cheney (March 11, 1872 – April 8, 1929) was an American activist and politician.

Cheney was born in Fond du Lac, Wisconsin. She went to the Fond du Lac public schools and taught school in Wisconsin. She married Dr. Henry W. Cheney, a physician from Chicago, Illinois.

Cheney was involved with the Illinois League of Women Voters. Cheney lived with her husband and family in Chicago. Cheney campaigned for her husband who won an alderman seat. She also campaigned for her longtime friend Katherine Hancock Goode, who won a seat in the state legislature. After Goode's death, Cheney served in the Illinois House of Representatives in 1929. She died while still in office in a hospital in Chicago, Illinois after suffering from a short illness. She was a Republican. A park bench commemorates Goode and Cheney.

Notes

1872 births
1929 deaths
Politicians from Chicago
Politicians from Fond du Lac, Wisconsin
Activists from Illinois
Educators from Wisconsin
American women educators
Women state legislators in Illinois
Members of the Illinois House of Representatives
Educators from Illinois